Nusaybah bint Ka'ab (also ʾUmm ʿAmmarah, Umm Umara, Umm marah), was one of the early women to convert to Islam. She was one of the companions of Muhammad.

Life
A member of the Banu Najjar tribe living in Medina, Nusaybah was the sister of Abdullah bin K'ab, and the mother of Abdullah and Habib ibn Zayd al-Ansari. 

When 74 leaders, warriors, and statesmen of Medina descended on al-Aqabah to swear an oath of allegiance to Islam following the teaching of the new religion by Mus`ab ibn `Umair in the city, Nusaybah and Umm Munee Asma bint ʿAmr bin 'Adi were the only two women to personally pledge directly to the Islamic prophet Muhammad. The latter's husband, Ghazyah bin ʿAmr, informed Muhammad that the women also wanted to give their bayah in person, and he agreed. She returned to Medina and began teaching Islam to the women of the city. This bayah or pledge was the de facto handing over of power to Muhammad over the city, by its key figures.
Her most renowned role came in the battle of Uhud, where she defended the prophet. She also participated in the battle of Hunain, Yamamah and the Treaty of Hudaybia.

Her two sons, both later martyrs in battle, were from her first marriage to Zaid bin ʿAsim Mazni. She later married bin ʿAmr, and had another son Tameem and a daughter Khawlah.

References

Women companions of the Prophet
 Year of death missing
 Converts to Islam
 Women in medieval warfare
 Year of birth unknown
 Women in war in the Middle East
Nusaybah family
Islams Women - Umm 'Umarah - Nusaybah bint Ka'b